In category theory, a branch of mathematics, the density theorem states that every presheaf of sets is a colimit of representable presheaves in a canonical way.

For example, by definition, a simplicial set is a presheaf on the simplex category Δ and a representable simplicial set is exactly of the form  (called the standard n-simplex) so the theorem says: for each simplicial set X,

where the colim runs over an index category determined by X.

Statement 
Let F be a presheaf on a category C; i.e., an object of the functor category . For an index category over which a colimit will run, let I be the category of elements of F: it is the category where
 an object is a pair  consisting of an object U in C and an element ,
 a morphism  consists of a morphism  in C such that 
It comes with the forgetful functor .

Then F is the colimit of the diagram (i.e., a functor)

where the second arrow is the Yoneda embedding: .

Proof 
Let f denote the above diagram. To show the colimit of f is F, we need to show: for every presheaf G on C, there is a natural bijection:

where  is the constant functor with value G and Hom on the right means the set of natural transformations. This is because the universal property of a colimit amounts to saying  is the left adjoint to the diagonal functor 

For this end, let  be a natural transformation. It is a family of morphisms indexed by the objects in I:

that satisfies the property: for each morphism  in I, 
(since )

The Yoneda lemma says there is a natural bijection . Under this bijection,  corresponds to a unique element . We have:

because, according to the Yoneda lemma,  corresponds to 

This determines the natural transformation ; indeed, for each morphism  in I, we have:

since . Clearly, the construction  is reversible. Hence,  is the requisite natural bijection.

Notes

References 
 

Representable functors